This is a list of electoral results for the electoral district of Kara Kara in Victorian state elections.

Members for Kara Kara

Kara Kara was abolished in 1927, the Electoral district of Kara Kara and Borung was created 1927 and existed until 1945. Pennington was member for Kara Kara and Borung from 1927 to 1935.

 = by-election

Election results

Elections in the 1970s

Elections in the 1960s

Elections in the 1950s

Elections in the 1920s

Elections in the 1910s

References

Victoria (Australia) state electoral results by district